Karim Hesham Mohamed Mohamed El Eraki (born 29 November 1997), is an Egyptian footballer who plays for Egyptian Premier League side Al Masry as a right-back.

Honours

Egypt
Africa U-23 Cup of Nations Champions: 2019

References

External links
 
 
 
 

1997 births
Living people
Egyptian footballers
Association football defenders
Egyptian Premier League players
Al Masry SC players
Egypt youth international footballers
Footballers at the 2020 Summer Olympics
Olympic footballers of Egypt